Aasiya Nasir is a Pakistani politician who had been a member of the National Assembly of Pakistan, from 2002 to May 2018.

Early life and education
She was born on 15 July 1971 in Quetta, Pakistan.

She has done Masters in English Literature from Government Girls College, Quetta. She also received Certificate in Teachers Training from the Notre Dame Institute of Education.

Political career

Aasiya was elected to the National Assembly of Pakistan on a reserved seat for minorities as a candidate of Muttahida Majlis-e-Amal in 2002 Pakistani general election.

She was re-elected to the National Assembly on a seat reserved for women from Balochistan as a candidate of Muttahida Majlis-e-Amal in the 2008 Pakistani general election.

She was re-elected to the National Assembly of Pakistan as a candidate of Jamiat Ulema-e-Islam (F) on a seat reserved for minority in the 2013 Pakistani general election.

In June 2014, Aasiya raised the issue why non-Muslims cannot be elected as Prime Minister or President of the country. She also opposed the ban on consumption of alcohol by the non-Muslim community in Pakistan.

References

Living people
1971 births
People from Quetta
Pakistani MNAs 2013–2018
Pakistani Christians
Jamiat Ulema-e-Islam (F) politicians
Pakistani MNAs 2002–2007
Pakistani MNAs 2008–2013
Women members of the National Assembly of Pakistan
21st-century Pakistani women politicians